Grimontia sedimenti is a Gram-negative, slightly halophilic, facultative anaerobic and mesophilic bacterium species from the genus of Grimontia which has been isolated from benthic sediments near the cost of Kubbar Island.

References 

Vibrionales
Bacteria described in 2021